Zoltán Szabó de Kisjolsva (18 July 1858 – 3 November 1934) was a Hungarian politician and military officer, who served as Minister of Defence in the counter-revolutionary government against the Hungarian Soviet Republic.

Career
Szabó attended Theresian Military Academy since 1875 finished his military studies on 24 April 1879. He participated in the World War I as commander of several infantry units. He was promoted to Major-General and appointed Commander of the 216th Infantry Brigade of the Royal Hungarian Honvéd, one of the armed forces of Austria-Hungary, on 18 May 1918. His infantry stationed near Slatina, Caracal and Corabia in Oltenia, Southern Romania as part of the Austro-Hungarian and German occupation force after August 1918. A month later, the infantry had been withdrawn into Eastern Transylvania.

After the Aster Revolution on 31 October 1918, newly-installed Prime Minister Mihály Károlyi appointed Zoltán Szabó as military commander of Transylvania. Following the establishment of the Hungarian Soviet Republic, Szabó, as Minister of Defence, became a member of the counter-revolutionary government in Arad led by Prime Minister Gyula Károlyi. When the rival government moved to Szeged on 30 May 1919, the Romanian authorities intercepted Szabó, who was unable to join the fellow ministers. Szabó was replaced by Miklós Horthy on 6 June 1919. Szabó was interned to Craiova by the Romanian army leadership.

Following the Hungarian-Romanian War of 1919, Szabó stayed in Romania. Later he became Chairman of the Board of the Central Savings Bank of Arad.

Family
Zoltán Szabó married Hajnalka Tagányi, a daughter of Baron Sándor Tagányi, a Member of Parliament. During their wedding, Baron Tagányi donated Pálosbaracka estate to her daughter as a wedding gift.

References

Sources
 Rubicon 2010/06
 Három évtized története életrajzokban. Szerk. Gellért Imre és Madarász Elemér. Bp., Európa Irodalmi és Nyomdai Rt., [1932].
 Magyar politikai lexikon. Szerk. Madarász Elemér. Bp., Magyar Politikai Lexikon Kiadóvállalat, 1935. 
 Új magyar életrajzi lexikon. Főszerk. Markó László. Bp., Magyar Könyvklub

1858 births
1934 deaths
Defence ministers of Hungary
Hungarian people of the Hungarian–Romanian War
Hungarian prisoners of war
Prisoners of war held by Romania
Hungarian–Romanian War prisoners of war
People from Kobilje